{{Infobox person
| name        = K. Sukumaran
| image       = K.SukumaranImage.jpg
| alt         = 
| caption     = 
| birth_name  = 
| birth_date  = 
| birth_place = Mayyanad, India
| death_date  = 
| death_place = 
| nationality = Indian
| other_names = ′Patradhipar′ K Sukumaran
| known_for   = Kerala Kaumudi Daily; Kala Kaumudi
| occupation  = Editor
| awards      = Padmabhushan
}}
K. Sukumaran (8 January 1903 – 18 September 1981), was the editor of Kerala Kaumudi Daily''. He served as the President of Sree Narayana Dharma Paripalana Yogam during 1953-54.

Personal life

K. Sukumaran was born on 8 January 1903 to reformer, thinker and socio-cultural leader C.V. Kunhiraman and Kunjikavu in Mayyanad of Kollam District who established Kerala Kaumudi as a periodical in 1911. K.Sukumaran's brother K.Damodaran who was the Head Translator to the Govt was also a known writer and public figure and Sister Vasanthi was married to C. Kesavan, Chief Minister of Travancore-Cochin State. He married Madhavi and had four sons- (all late) M.S. Mani, M.S. Madhusoodanan,  M.S. Sreenivasan and M.S.Ravi who are all running the Newspaper and other Publications of Kerala Kaumudi and Kala Kaumudi.

Awards and recognitions
K. Sukumaran was honored Padmabhushan, the third highest civilian Award by Government of India in 1973.

References

External links

1903 births
Indian newspaper editors
People from Kollam district
Recipients of the Padma Bhushan in literature & education
1981 deaths
Malayalam-language journalists
20th-century Indian journalists
Journalists from Kerala
Indian male journalists